Al-Zaeem is a political satirical play consisting of nine scenes. The play was written by Farouq Sabri, and starring Adel Emam, Ahmed Rateb, Youssef Dawoud, and Ragaa Al Geddawy. The play was first performed in 1993. The play talks about Zeinhom, a simple man who could not hold out in any business for long time because he looks like his country's President (Al-Zaeem). Unfortunately, Al-Zaeem is an unpopular dictator. Zeinhom gets a job, which is to become an actor and plays a secondary role as a thief in foreign Funded movie that is being filmed locally, Which leads him to serious consequences.

The play makes a strong mockery of post-modern rulers in Arab countries (after World War II). The play was banned in several Arab countries such as Tunisia and Libya. There were reportedly attempts by former Libyan president Muammar Gaddafi to assassinate Adel Imam, as Adel Imam imitated Gaddafi in a sarcastic way in the first scene in the play.

References

1993 plays
Political satire plays
Comedy plays
Postmodern plays
Satirical plays
Arabic-language plays
Egyptian plays
African plays